Moraxella atlantae is a Gram-negative, oxidase-positive and catalase-positive, rod-shaped, nonmotile bacterium in the genus Moraxella, which was isolated from aerobic blood cultures from a female cancer patient. M. atlantae is a rare opportunistic pathogen which can usually be treated by common antibiotics.

References

External links
Type strain of Moraxella atlantae at BacDive -  the Bacterial Diversity Metadatabase
 	

Moraxellaceae
Bacteria described in 1976